The Tyrone Senior Hurling Championship is an annual hurling competition contested by top-tier Tyrone GAA clubs. The Tyrone County Board of the Gaelic Athletic Association has organised it since 1905.

Éire Óg Carrickmore are the title holders (2021) defeating Eoghan Ruadh, Dungannon in the Final.

History
In 2008 The County final was decided in a replay, and was the first time the Tyrone Senior Hurling Club Championship final was ever played under floodlights. Carrickmore captured their 19th title, completing 3-in-row, for the second time in 7 years, and putting them one behind the leaders Eoghan Ruadh who have 20. Eoghan Ruadh are the longest serving club since 1944. Eoghan Ruadh Dún Geanainn won the 2009 final un-expectedly defeating arch rivals Éire Óg An Charraig Mhor to claim their 21st title.

In 2010 Éire Óg reclaimed the Benburb Cup over current holders Dungannon, it was one of the greatest wins for Éire Óg over their arch rivals Dungannon after the shock defeat in the previous year's final. In the 2014 Championship finals Éire Óg defeated Eoghan Ruadh in Healy Park to claim the club's 23rd Senior Championship, making the Carrickmore outfit the record holders of the Benburb Cup.

Format
Since 2005, the competition involves five clubs playing each other once in a round robin group. After all games are completed, the top two teams play each other in the Tyrone Senior Hurling Championship Final for the Benburb Cup while the teams that finish 3rd and 4th play for the Tyrone Junior Hurling Championship.

Honours
The trophy presented to the winners is the ? The club that wins the Tyrone Senior Championship qualifies to represent their county in the Ulster Intermediate Hurling Club Championship, while the club that wins the Tyrone Junior Championship qualifies to represent their county in the Ulster Junior Hurling Club Championship.

List of finals

References

External links
 Official Tyrone Website
 Tyrone on Hoganstand
 Tyrone Club GAA

Hurling competitions in Northern Ireland
Hurling competitions in Ulster
Senior hurling county championships
Hurling competitions in County Tyrone